Isnello (Sicilian: Isneddu) is a comune (municipality) in the Metropolitan City of Palermo in the Italian region of Sicily, located about  southeast of Palermo.

Isnello borders the following municipalities: Castelbuono, Cefalù, Collesano, Gratteri, Petralia Sottana, Polizzi Generosa, Scillato.

Former New York City mayor Vincent R. Impellitteri was born in Isnello in 1900.

Demographic evolution

References

External links
 Extracted Civil Records

Municipalities of the Metropolitan City of Palermo